Valkó is a village and commune in the comitatus of Pest in Hungary.

Location 
Valkó is located in central Hungary, in the eastern part of Pest County.

Transportation 
This settlement has roads to Vácszentlászló and Gödöllő. Valkó has regular buses to Vácszentlászló, Gödöllő and Budapest, but rare buses travels to Tóalmás and Jászberény, too. The nearest motorway is the M3, which can be approached through Gödöllő. The nearest railway stations are located in Tura and Gödöllő.

Education

Kindergartens 
Napköziotthonos Óvoda

Elementary schools 
Móra Ferenc Elementary School

Populated places in Pest County